Delano J. Demps (born February 12, 1970) is an American professional basketball executive and former player who is currently a front office assistant for the Minnesota Timberwolves of the National Basketball Association (NBA). Prior to that, he served as an assistant coach for the Utah Jazz and the general manager of the New Orleans Hornets/Pelicans from 2010 to 2019. A 6'3" guard from the University of the Pacific, Demps played for the Golden State Warriors, San Antonio Spurs, and Orlando Magic, despite being undrafted.

Demps also played in France, Greece, Croatia, Turkey and the Philippines. Demps was a former PBA import back in the 1990s. He played with Shell and 7-Up.

Personal life
Born in Long Beach, California, Demps played high school basketball for Mt. Eden High School in Hayward, California. Demps is married to Anita Demps, and they have three children: Jourdan Johnson, Tre Demps, and Riley Demps.

References

External links
NBA stats @ basketballreference.com
Dell Demps Q & A @ NBA.com

1970 births
Living people
African-American basketball players
African-American basketball coaches
African-American sports executives and administrators
American sports executives and administrators
American expatriate basketball people in Croatia
American expatriate basketball people in France
American expatriate basketball people in Greece
American expatriate basketball people in the Philippines
American expatriate basketball people in Turkey
American men's basketball players
Basketball players from Long Beach, California
Galatasaray S.K. (men's basketball) players
Golden State Warriors players
Greek Basket League players
KK Cibona players
National Basketball Association general managers
New Orleans Hornets executives
New Orleans Pelicans executives
Oklahoma City Cavalry players
Orlando Magic players
P.A.O.K. BC players
Pacific Tigers men's basketball players
Philippine Basketball Association imports
Point guards
San Antonio Spurs players
Shell Turbo Chargers players
Shooting guards
SLUC Nancy Basket players
Sportspeople from Long Beach, California
TNT Tropang Giga players
Trenton Shooting Stars players
Undrafted National Basketball Association players
Utah Jazz assistant coaches
Yakima Sun Kings players
21st-century African-American sportspeople
20th-century African-American people